The 1978–79 Austrian Hockey League season was the 49th season of the Austrian Hockey League, the top level of ice hockey in Austria. Eight teams participated in the league, and EC KAC won the championship.

First round

Final round

5th-8th place

External links
Austrian Ice Hockey Association

Austria
Austrian Hockey League seasons
Aust